The Mancos Opera House, at 136 W. Grand Ave. in Mancos, Colorado, was built in 1910.  It was listed on the National Register of Historic Places in 1988.  It has also been known as Checkerboard Hall.

It is a three-story building which was built and owned by A.J. Ames and George Woods.  It is prominent on Grand Avenue, the main street of Mancos.  It and the Bauer Bank Building, also NRHP-listed, "are among the largest, intact commercial buildings in Mancos and in Montezuma County.

References

		
National Register of Historic Places in Montezuma County, Colorado
Theatres completed in 1910
Opera houses